is a private junior college in Yatsushiro, Kumamoto, Japan, established in 1974.

External links
 Official website 

Educational institutions established in 1974
Private universities and colleges in Japan
Universities and colleges in Kumamoto Prefecture
Japanese junior colleges